Martin Persson Nilsson (Stoby, Kristianstad County, 12 July 1874 – Lund, 7 April 1967) was a Swedish philologist, mythographer, and a scholar of the Greek, Hellenistic and Roman religious systems. In his studies he combined literary evidence with archaeological evidence, linking historic and prehistoric evidence for the evolution of the Greek mythological cycles.

Biography
Beginning in 1900 as a tutor at the University of Lund, he was appointed Secretary to the Swedish Archaeological Commission working in Rhodes, in 1905. In 1909 he was appointed Professor of Ancient Greek, Classical Archaeology and Ancient History at Lund. Later, Nilsson was Secretary of the Royal Society of Letters in Lund and an Associate of the Royal Swedish Academy of Letters, History and Antiquities, in Stockholm. In 1924 he was made a corresponding member of the Prussian Academy of Sciences.

Works
Nilsson had previously published it in Swedish under the title  (1922). In English his Minoan-Mycenaean Religion, and Its Survival in Greek Religion is more often quoted. Other important works include:
Primitive Time-Reckoning; A Study in the Origins and First Development of the Art of Counting Time Among the Primitive and Early Culture Peoples (Lund: C. W. K. Gleerup) 1920
The Mycenaean Origin of Greek Mythology (Berkeley: University of California Press) 1932 (On-line text) This work had its origins in the Sather Classical Lectures
Homer and Mycenae (London: Methuen) 1933
Primitive Religion 1934
"Early Orphism and Kindred Religious Movements" Harvard Theological Review 28 (1935):180-230
The Age of the Early Greek Tyrants (Belfast) 1936 (The Dill Memorial Lecture)
Greek Popular Religion (New York: Cat) 1940 (On-line text) 
 
Translated as Greek Piety (Norton/Oxford University Press) 1969
Translated as 
Greek Folk Religion. Reprinted with a foreword by Arthur Darby Nock, 1972
 
Translated as 
Minoan-Mycenaean Religion, and Its Survival in Greek Religion (Lund: Gleerup); revised 2nd ed. 1950
The Bacchic Mysteries in Italy 
See also "The Bacchic Mysteries in the Roman Age" Harvard Theological Review 46 (1953):175-202
Cults, Myths, Oracles, and Politics in Ancient Greece (Studies in Mediterranean Archeology)
The Historical Hellenistic Background of the New Testament (The Bedell Lecture, Kenyon College)

References
"Martin P. Nilsson: In Memoriam" The Harvard Theological Review 60.4 (October 1967), p. 373.

Further reading
Einar Gjerstad, Martin P. Nilsson in memoriam. (Lund: Gleerup) 1968. (With Erik Johan Knudtzon et al., Bibliographie Martin P. Nilsson.) 
John Granlund, "Martin Persson Nilsson (1874–1967)" 'in Dag Strömbäck (ed.) Leading folklorists of the North (Oslo) 1971:135–170.

External links
About the Bookplate of Martin P. Nilsson 

1874 births
1967 deaths
Swedish classical scholars
Members of the Prussian Academy of Sciences
Corresponding Fellows of the British Academy
Members of the Royal Gustavus Adolphus Academy